Caden Lemor McLoughlin Henry (born 6 March 2005) is a professional footballer currently playing as a forward for Spanish club Roda.

Club career
Born on the Costa del Sol, Málaga, Spain, to an Irish mother from Finglas, Dublin, McLouglin started his career with amateur side ADC Esteponense at the age of seven, before joining Málaga in 2016. While contracted to Málaga, he played for affiliate club San Félix Cadete. After five years with Los Albicelestes, he left the club by mutual consent in August 2020.

Following his departure from Málaga, he joined La Liga side Villarreal. He signed his first professional contract with Villarreal in April 2021. For the 2022–23 season, he was sent to affiliate club Roda.

International career
McLoughlin is eligible to represent the Republic of Ireland and Spain. He has represented the Republic of Ireland at under-15, scoring a hattrick on his debut against Luxembourg, and under-17 level.

Personal life
McLouglin supports English side Chelsea, and lists former Chelsea player Didier Drogba, as well as Brazilian Neymar, as players he looks up to.

References

External links
 

2005 births
Living people
Footballers from Andalusia
Sportspeople from the Province of Málaga
Republic of Ireland association footballers
Republic of Ireland youth international footballers
Spanish footballers
Irish people of Spanish descent
Spanish people of Irish descent
Association football forwards
ADC Esteponense men's players
Málaga CF players
Villarreal CF players